The 1893 women's suffrage petition was the third of three petitions to the New Zealand Government in support of women's suffrage and resulted in the Electoral Act 1893, which gave women the right to vote in the 1893 general election. The 1893 petition was substantially larger than the 1891 petition, which had around 9,000 signatures, and larger still than the 1892 petition, which contained some 20,000 signatures. The third petition was the largest petition presented to Parliament at that point with nearly 32,000 signatures. The petition was signed in various parts of the country by women, aged 21 or older, who signed their names and addresses.

The petition was submitted to Parliament on 28 July 1893. There were another 12 smaller petitions which have not survived.  

Politicians John Hall, Alfred Saunders, and Premier John Ballance were all in favour of women's suffrage, but the effort was largely led by the New Zealand branch of the Woman's Christian Temperance Union led by Kate Sheppard from 1887.

The petition is on display at the National Library of New Zealand in Wellington as part of the He Tohu exhibition. It remains, however, under the care of the Chief Archivist and Archives New Zealand. It has been on the UNESCO Memory of the World register since 1997. 

The 1891 petition has not survived but the 1892 petition is held by Archives New Zealand.

References

Further reading

External links 

 New Zealand suffrage milestones

Political history of New Zealand
Women's rights in New Zealand
Memory of the World Register in New Zealand
Feminism in New Zealand
1893 in women's history
1893 documents